Friends Meeting House, Richmond is a building in Retreat Road, just off Friars Lane in the centre of Richmond, London, at which Richmond-upon-Thames Quakers meet for worship for an hour each Sunday morning.

References

External links

Richmond
Richmond, London